The Taolu World Cup is an elite-level international sports championship hosted by the International Wushu Federation (IWUF) for the sport of wushu taolu. Athletes qualify by placing in the top-eight of a standard taolu event at the prior World Wushu Championships. Renditions in 2016 and 2018 have been held so far with the 3rd Taolu World Cup being rescheduled for 2022.

Events

Medal table 
Last updated after the 2nd Taolu World Cup in 2018.

References

External links 

 2016 Results
 2018 Results

Wushu competitions
Recurring sporting events established in 2016